Jackass: The Movie (The Official Soundtrack) is the official soundtrack for the American comedy film Jackass: The Movie. The soundtrack, containing music and dialogue from the film, was released on October 25, 2002 on Interscope. The album made it to #173 on the Billboard 200 and #11 on the Billboard's Top Soundtracks chart. Two songs on the album, "Let's Get Fucked Up" (which contains profanities) and "Baby Got Back" (which contains sexual references), gave it a parental advisory warning. The rest of songs contain no explicit content. A clean version of the album, which removes the profanities in "Let's Get Fucked Up", was also released. The song is censored by blanking and the use of a sound of a record scratching.

Track listing

References 

2002 soundtrack albums
Interscope Records soundtracks
Comedy film soundtracks